The Rafa Nadal Open is a professional tennis tournament played on hard courts. It is currently part of the ATP Challenger Tour. It is held annually in Manacor, Spain since 2018.

Past finals

Singles

Doubles

External links
 Official website

ATP Challenger Tour
Hard court tennis tournaments
Tennis tournaments in Spain
Manacor
Recurring sporting events established in 2018
Sport in Mallorca